Alison C. Bonner (born 27 June 1962) is a former British rower who competed the 1988 Summer Olympics.

Rowing career
Bonner was part of the coxed four with Sarah Hunter-Jones, Tish Reid, Ann Callaway and Lesley Clare (cox), that won the national title rowing for A.R.A squad, at the 1985 National Championships. The following year she represented England and won a silver medal in the eight, at the 1986 Commonwealth Games in Edinburgh, Scotland. She was part of the coxless pairs with Kim Thomas that won the national title rowing for a Kingston and Weybridge Ladies composite, at the 1987 National Championships.

In 1988 she was selected to represent Great Britain in the women's coxless pair event at the 1988 Olympic Games in Seoul. The pair which consisted of Bonner and Thomas finished in eighth place.

Academic career
Bonner has been a lecturer in Celtic History in the Department of Anglo-Saxon, Norse and Celtic at the University of Cambridge since 2016. She joined Queens' College, Cambridge as a Fellow in 2019. She studied for her Ph.D. in Anglo-Saxon, Norse & Celtic at Hughes Hall, Cambridge.

References

External links
 

1962 births
Living people
British female rowers
Olympic rowers of Great Britain
Rowers at the 1988 Summer Olympics
Rowers from Greater London
Commonwealth Games medallists in rowing
Commonwealth Games silver medallists for England
Rowers at the 1986 Commonwealth Games
Medallists at the 1986 Commonwealth Games